Hafta Vasuli (Extortion) is a 1998 Indian Bollywood film produced and directed by Deepak Balraj Vij. It stars Jackie Shroff, Aditya Pancholi, Ayub Khan, Madhoo and Saadhika Randhawa in pivotal roles.

Plot
Lotiram Khabadia is an MLA based in Bombay, who is corrupt, and involved in all kinds of criminal activities. He has close links with another gangster and wrestler, Tamancha. With elections coming closer, Lotiram and Tamancha start canvassing for themselves, to retain power. Their competitor is a eunuch by the name of Chayavati. The people announce their verdict, and Chayavati is elected. Lotiram is devastated, as no one really pays attention to him anymore Even Tamancha will have nothing to do with him. Upset at the humiliation at the hands of Tamancha, Lotiram seeks the help of a former municipal employee, Yeshwant, and becomes a witness for the prosecution, so as to enable them to lay charges against Tamancha. Corrupt elements within the police alert Tamancha, who is enraged at Lotiram, and will do anything to stop him from testifying.

Cast
 Jackie Shroff... Yeshwant Pandey
 Aditya Pancholi... Salim
 Ayub Khan... Ram Chauhan
 Madhoo... Inspector Durga
 Saadhika Randhawa... Radha
 Gulshan Grover...	Lotiram Kibadi
 Hemant Birje... Tamancha Bihari
 Laxmikant Berde... Chayavati
 Ravi Patwardhan... Senior Police Officer

Soundtrack 

The music of the film is composed Rajesh Roshan with lyrics by Mohan Sharma, Pandit Visheshwar Sharma, Maya Govind & K.K Verma. The soundtrack was released in 1997 on audio cassettes and CDs by Bombino Music. The album consists of six songs and two instrumental tracks. The full album is recorded by Kumar Sanu, Suchitra Krishnamurthy, Alka Yagnik, Millind Sagar, Udit Narayan Poornima (Sushma Shrestha), Nayan Rathod, and Kumar Sonik.

References

External links

1990s Hindi-language films
1998 films
Films scored by Rajesh Roshan